Alessandro Romano (born 30 September 1969 in Rome) is a retired Italian professional footballer who played as a defender.

References

External links

1969 births
Living people
Italian footballers
Italian expatriate footballers
Expatriate footballers in Scotland
Serie A players
Serie B players
Scottish Premier League players
A.C. Monza players
A.C. Cesena players
S.S. Lazio players
Brescia Calcio players
Genoa C.F.C. players
Hellas Verona F.C. players
Dundee F.C. players
Italian expatriate sportspeople in Scotland
Association football defenders